The 4th (Czech) Rapid Deployment Brigade (4. brigáda rychlého nasazení) is a brigade of the Army of the Czech Republic. It is assigned to the NATO Allied Rapid Reaction Corps. Units from the brigade have deployed as part of KFOR, ISAF and EUTM Mali. The brigade consists of three battalions and is considered as spearhead of the Army of the Czech Republic. It builds the core of the 4th Brigade Task Force. Soldiers of the brigade wear red berets. That will change on end of June 2023 when the whole brigade will change to the new khaki berets as the rest of the ground forces.

History
The brigade HQ was created on 1 January 1994 in Havlíčkův Brod with the activation of the whole brigade on 1. Jully 1994. The first commander was then Colonel Jiří Šedivý who later became chief of the general staff. At the time of creation it was combined arms brigade with 2 mechanized infantry battalions (41st and 42nd), mechanized airborne battalion (43rd), recon battalion, artilery group as well as engineering, signal and logistic battalions, NBC protection company and medical group. It was in direct command of chief of general staff as national Immediate Response Force. It was equipped with BVP-2 IFV at the time.

In 1997 it was transfered under command of the Land Forces. In that year units of the brigade were deployed to help with cleaning efforts after floods in Moravia. After joining NATO it became part of the NATO Rapid Reaction Force.

On 8 May 1999 brigade received honorary name "Obrany Národa" from president Václav Havel.

In 2003 it was reduced in size as part of reorganisation of the Czech Army. From the original 10 battalions only three mechanized ones reaimned, one of them airborne. One year after that reoganisaton the HQ together with 41st mechanized battalion were moved to Žatec.

In 2008 the strenght of the unit was increased with newly formed 44th motorised light infantry battalion at Jindřichův Hradec that replaced 153rd rescue battalion that was disbanded.

In 2010 the 41st and 42nd mechanized battalions exchanged their old tracked BVP-2 IFV for wheeled Pandur II vehicles. In 2016 new battalon was expected to be formed, the 45th mechanized infantry bn. at Rakovník. It was however changed and after trasnfering organisational core to 15th engineering regiment it eventually became Host Nation Support  Battalion.

In 2017 the brigade was affiliated to 10th Tank Division of Bundeswehr.

In 2020 the 43rd airborne battalion was transfered to direct command of Land Forces and was reorganised into 43rd Airborne Regiment as a third ground maneuver element of the Czech Army. 

In 2022 and 2023 units from 41st and 42nd mechanized battalions served as part of the newly created NATO eFP Slovakia battlegoup at Lešť commanded by Czechia.

Structure
The brigade as of 2023 consists of following units:
Headquarters and Staff (Žatec)
 41. mechanizovaný prapor (41.mpr) "gen. Josefa Malého“. - 41st Mechanised (Infantry) Battalion (Žatec)
  42. mechanizovaný prapor (42.mpr) "Svatováclavský" - 42nd Mechanised (Infantry) Battalion (Tábor)
  44. lehký motorizovaný prapor (44.lmopr) - 44th  Motorised Infantry Light Battalion (Jindřichův Hradec)
 Signal company
 Support company

References 

Military of the Czech Republic
Military units and formations of the Czech Republic
Group sized units of armies (land forces)